Oak Island, Minnesota is an island and unincorporated community in Lake of the Woods, in Lake of the Woods County, Minnesota, United States, on the Minnesota/Ontario border. It is part of Angle Township.  The ZIP Code for Oak Island is 56741.

Oak Island
Oak Island is an island near the center of Lake of the Woods at the extreme northeast corner of Minnesota's Northwest Angle that reaches farther north than the rest of the state. Oak Island is approximately three miles long and one mile wide. The island is the site of several resorts, fishing camps, a small store, and a post office. Much of the interior of the island is part of the Red Lake Indian Reservation.

At the southwest tip of the island is Laketrails Island, the site of Laketrails Base Camp, a wilderness canoe trip camp for teenagers. Its post office is located at Sportsman's Oak Island Lodge, a fishing lodge, on the northeast side of the island of Oak Island.

Notes

Landforms of Lake of the Woods County, Minnesota
Lake islands of Minnesota
Lake of the Woods